Razmgah may refer to:
 Razmgah-e Olya
 Razmgah-e Sofla